Boniewo  is a village in Włocławek County, Kuyavian-Pomeranian Voivodeship, in north-central Poland. It is the seat of the gmina (administrative district) called Gmina Boniewo.

References

Boniewo